Kornmanniaceae is a family of green algae in the order Ulvales.

Accepted genera 
 Blidingia Kylin
 Kornmannia Bliding
 Lithotrichon Darienko & Pröschold
 Neostromatella M.J.Wynne, G.Furnari & R.Nielsen        
 Pseudendoclonium Wille
 Tellamia Batters

Synonyms 
 Dilabifilum Tschermak-Woess, 1971, nom. inval., currently regarded as a synonym of Pseudendoclonium. 
 Stromatella Kornmann & Sahling, 1985, nom. inval., currently regarded as a synonym of Neostromatella.

References

Ulvales
Ulvophyceae families